Max Nagy is an English rugby union player, currently playing for United Rugby Championship side Ospreys. His preferred position is wing or fullback.

Career
Nagy was born in Buckingham, and played youth rugby for Buckingham RFC. He was part of the Northampton Saints academy, playing as an outside half. After being released, he returned to Buckingham RFC, before a playing stint in New Zealand. Nagy later attended Swansea University, and played for the university team as a fullback and wing.

While at Swansea University, he signed for Swansea RFC and was part of the Ospreys Development side.

Nagy was named in the squad for Round 3 of the Pro14 Rainbow Cup competition in the match against . He made his debut in the same match as a replacement, scoring a try.

References

External links
itsrugby.co.uk profile
all.rugby profile
Ospreys profile

Living people
Welsh rugby union players
Ospreys (rugby union) players
Rugby union wings
Rugby union fullbacks
1996 births